John Potter (January 12, 1910 – June 4, 1991) was an American fencer. He competed in the team foil event at the 1936 Summer Olympics.

References

External links
 

1910 births
1991 deaths
American male foil fencers
Olympic fencers of the United States
Fencers at the 1936 Summer Olympics
Fencers from Paris
French male foil fencers